Chortkiv (Chortkov) is a city in Chortkiv Raion, Ternopil Oblast (province) in western Ukraine. It is the administrative center of the Chortkiv Raion (district), housing the district's local administration buildings. Chortkiv hosts the administration of Chortkiv urban hromada, one of the hromadas of Ukraine. Population: 

Chortkiv is located in the northern part of the historic region of Galician Podolia on the banks of the Seret River.

In the past Chortkiv was the home of many Hasidic Jews; it was a notable shtetl and had a significant number of Jews residing there prior to the Holocaust. Today, Chortkiv is a regional commercial and small-scale manufacturing center. Among its architectural monuments is a fortress built in the 16th and 17th centuries as well as historic wooden churches of the 17th and 18th centuries.

History

The first historical mention of Chortkiv dates to 1522, when Polish King Sigismund I the Old granted an ownership order for Jerzy Czortkowski over the town and allowed him to name it after himself—Czortków. The small community, numbering at 50 families, were almost all massacred during the Chmielnicki Uprisings of 1648–9. Jewish leadership opposed the resettlement of Jews in Chortkiv until 1705. During that time, the town was also granted Magdeburg rights. However, Chortkiv would later decline in the second half of the 17th century during Ottoman Expansion of central Europe. The town was taken over by Ottoman Empire, whose rule lasted 27 years. It was part of the short-lived Turkish Podolia Eyalet, which lasted from 1672 to 1699. During this period, it was nahiya centre in Yazlofça sanjak as Çortkuv (Spelled as Chortkoov in Turkish). After First Partition of Poland Chortkiv came under Austro-Hungarian rule which lasted from 1772 to 1918, during the time of which it was the center of the Chortkiv Bezirk except brief Russian rule between 1809 and 1815 as part of Tarnopol Governorate. On June 8, 1919 the Ukrainian Galician Army broke for couple months through the Polish front at Chortkiv and began the Chortkiv offensive. Soon afterwards, the town was seized by the Poles. It was ceded to sovereign Poland in the Peace Treaty of Riga between Poland, Soviet Russia (acting also on behalf of Soviet Belarus) and Soviet Ukraine, and remained part of the Tarnopol Voivodeship of the Second Polish Republic until the Soviet invasion of Poland in September 1939.

In 1931, the town had 19,037 inhabitants, 10504 were Polish Roman Catholics, 4860 were Ukrainian and Polish Jews, and 3633 were Ukrainian.

Chortkiv was an important garrison of the Polish Border Defence Corps Brigade "Podole", whose commandant from 1935 to 1938 was General Stefan Rowecki. Furthermore, it was home to the 36th Reserve Infantry Division.

The town was annexed by the Soviet Union from September 17, 1939 until June 1941. Its Polish inhabitants, particularly students of the local high school, organized a failed uprising in January 1940, which would serve as the first Polish uprising of World War II. From 1941-1944 it was annexed to Nazi Germany. After the defeat of the Nazis by the Red Army in 1944, the town returned to Soviet control until in 1991 it became part of independent Ukraine. The Jewish residents were persecuted and deported as part of the Holocaust. The surviving Polish residents of the town were transferred to the Recovered Territories in the immediate postwar period (see Polish population transfers (1944–1946)).

Due to heavy destruction of Ternopil, in 1944 Chortkiv served as a regional seat.

In January 1989 the population was 26 681 people.

In January 2013 the population was 29 640 people.

In 2019, at the 40-meter height of the tower of the Saint Stanislaus church in Chortkiv, archaeologist, researcher of fortifications and antiquities Volodymyr Dobrianskyi discovered a detonator of a shrapnel projectile, according to its flight trajectory determined that the 1st, 3rd, 4th and 7th cannon regiments (64 guns) under the command of Ataman Kirill Karas during the Chortkiv offensive (June 7–28, 1919) were stationed in the woods west of the village of Shmankivtsi in the Chortkiv district.

Until 18 July 2020, Chortkiv was designated as a city of oblast significance and did not belong to Chortkiv Raion even though it was the center of the raion. As part of the administrative reform of Ukraine, which reduced the number of raions of Ternopil Oblast to three, the city was merged into Chortkiv Raion.

The former Chortkiv Air Base is located nearby.

Climate

People from Chortkiv
 Kateryna Rubchakova (1881–1919), Ukrainian actress and singer
 Maria Maciyivska (born 1918), first soprano Leeds Church Toronto, Ontario 1954 - 2008. 
 Sacha Blonder (1909-1949),  Ecole de Paris painter
 Waclaw Czerwinski - Polish engineer and pilot, pioneer of Polish gliding,
 Jerzy Czortkowski, founder of Chortkiv
 Bernard Hausner (1874–1938), rabbi, diplomat and member of the Sejm
 Pinchas Horowitz (1731–1805), rabbi and Talmudist
 Jerzy Janicki (1928-2007) – Polish writer and reporter,
 Edward Kmiecik (born 1928) - Polish painter,
 Ireneusz Opacki (1933-2005) – academic of the Katowice Silesian University, expert on Polish literature,
 Jerzy Przystawa (born 1939) - Polish scientist, physicist,
 Alfred Trawinski - major of the Polish Army, doctor and professor of Medicine Academy of Lviv,
 Tadeusz Wazewski (1896-1972) – Polish scholar, mathematician, professor of Jagiellonian University,
 Shmelke of Nikolsburg (1746–1778), one of the great early Chasidic Rebbes
 Karl Emil Franzos (1848–1904), Austrian novelist
 Leopold Levytskyi (1906–1973), Ukrainian painter
 Perla (Penina) Richter Feldschu (1900-1943), Warsaw musicologist, wife of Zionist activist Ruben Feldschu (Ben Shem)
 Bernard (Berl) Hausner (1874-1938) father of Gideon Hausner. Gideon was the Prosecutor of Adolf Eichmann, and Attorney General of Israel.  Bernard was a Rabbi in Lemberg, Polish consul to Palestine, and Zionist.  Migrated to Israel in 1927.

Gallery

See also
 Chortkov (Hasidic dynasty)

References

8. Czortków KehilaLinks Site - JewishGen  http://kehilalinks.jewishgen.org/Suchostaw/sl_czortkow.htm

External links

 
 Miri Gershoni Shifris, Site dedicated to city Jews

 
Cities in Ternopil Oblast
Populated places in the Kingdom of Galicia and Lodomeria
Tarnopol Voivodeship
Jewish Galician (Eastern Europe) history
Historic Jewish communities in Poland
Jewish Ukrainian history
Cities of regional significance in Ukraine